This is a list of Dutch television related events from 1987.

Events
Unknown - Peter Douglas, performing as Frank Sinatra wins the third series of Soundmixshow, becoming the first man to have won.

Debuts

Television shows

1950s
NOS Journaal (1956–present)

1970s
Sesamstraat (1976–present)

1980s
Jeugdjournaal (1981–present)
Soundmixshow (1985-2002)

Ending this year

Births

Deaths